A royal mistress is the historical position and sometimes unofficial title of the extramarital lover of a monarch or an heir apparent, who was expected to provide certain services, such as sexual or romantic intimacy, companionship, and advice in return for security, titles, money, honours, and an influential place at the royal court. Thus, some royal mistresses have had considerable power, being the power behind the throne. The institution partly owes its prevalence to the fact that royal marriages used to be conducted solely on the basis of political and dynastic considerations, leaving little space for the monarch's personal preferences in the choice of a partner.

The title of royal mistress was never official, and most mistresses had an official reason to be at the court, such as being a lady-in-waiting or maid-of-honour to a female member of the royal family or a governess to the royal children. However, their real position was most often an open secret, and there was no real division between formal and informal political power in the early French court. From the 15th century onward and most importantly in France, chief mistresses gained a semi-official title (French: maîtresse-en-titre, literally "official mistress"), which came with its own assigned apartments in the palace. A chief mistress was also sometimes called a maîtresse déclarée, or "declared mistress". An unacknowledged, less important royal lover was known as a petite maîtresse ("little mistress").

In Europe, the children of mistresses were typically not included in the line of succession, except when secret marriages were alleged. They were however regularly given titles and high positions in the court or the army.

In Bavaria 
Lola Montez (1821–1861), mistress of Ludwig I.

In Belgium 
Arcadie Claret (1826–1897), mistress of Leopold I, King of Belgians;
Caroline Bauer (1807–1877), mistress of Leopold I;
Sybille de Selys Longchamps (born 1941), mistress of Albert II;
Caroline Lacroix (1883–1948), mistress of Leopold II.

In Bohemia 
Agnes of Kuenring (circa 1236 – flourished 1261), mistress of Ottokar II.

In Denmark 
Sophie Amalie Moth (1654–1719), mistress of Christian V.

In England

Edith the Fair (circa 1025 – circa 1066), mistress or more danico wife of Harold Godwinson;
Alice Perrers (1348–1400), mistress of Edward III;
Jane Shore (circa 1445 – circa 1527), mistress of Edward IV;
Elizabeth Blount (circa 1498/circa  1500/circa 1502 – 1540), mistress of Henry VIII;
Mary Boleyn (1499–1543), mistress of Henry VIII;
Anne Boleyn (1500/1501–1536), mistress and later wife of Henry VIII.

In France 

Agnès Sorel (1422–1450), mistress of Charles VII;
Diane de Poitiers (1500–1566), mistress of Henry II;
Françoise-Athénaïs de Rochechouart, Marquise de Montespan (1640–1707), mistress of Louis XIV;
Louise de La Vallière (1644–1710) mistress of Louis XIV;
Isabelle de Ludres (1647–1726), mistress of Louis XIV;
Marie Angélique de Scorailles (1661–1681), mistress of Louis XIV;
Madame de Pompadour (1721–1764), mistress of Louis XV;
Madame du Barry (1743–1793), mistress of Louis XV;
Marie Walewska (1786–1817), mistress of Napoleon.

In Great Britain 

Lucy Walter (circa 1630 – 1658), mistress of Charles II;
Barbara Palmer, 1st Duchess of Cleveland (1640–1709), mistress of Charles II;
Louise de Kérouaille, Duchess of Portsmouth, mistress of Charles II;
Nell Gwyn (1650–1687), mistress of Charles II;
Moll Davis (circa 1648 – 1708) mistress of Charles II;
Hortense Mancini (1646–1699), mistress of Charles II;
Arabella Churchill (1648–1730), mistress of James II;
Catherine Sedley, Countess of Dorchester (1657–1717), mistress of James II;
Elizabeth Villiers (1657–1733), mistress of William III;
Melusine von der Schulenburg, Duchess of Kendal, mistress of George I;
Henrietta Howard, Countess of Suffolk, mistress of George II;
Mary Scott, Countess of Deloraine (1703–1744), mistress of George II;
Amalie von Wallmoden, Countess of Yarmouth (1704–1765), mistress of George II;
Maria Fitzherbert (1756–1837), mistress of George IV;
Frances Villiers, Countess of Jersey (1753–1821), mistress of George IV;
Grace Elliott (circa 1754 – 1823), mistress of George IV;
Mary Robinson (1757–1800), mistress of George IV;
Isabella Ingram-Seymour-Conway, Marchioness of Hertford (1759–1839), mistress of George IV;
Elizabeth Conyngham, Marchioness Conyngham (1771–1861) mistress of George IV;
Dorothea Jordan (1761–1816), mistress of William IV before his accession to the throne;
Lady Susan Vane-Tempest (1839–1875), mistress of Edward VII;
Sarah Bernhardt (1844–1923) mistress of Edward VII;
Lady Randolph Churchill (1854–1921), mistress of Edward VII;
Lillie Langtry (1853–1929), mistress of Edward VII;
Daisy Greville, Countess of Warwick (1861–1938), mistress of Edward VII;
Alice Keppel (1868–1947), mistress of Edward VII;
Agnes Keyser (1852–1941), mistress of Edward VII;
Freda Dudley Ward (1894–1983), mistress of Edward VIII;
Thelma Furness, Vicountess Furness (1904–1970), mistress of Edward VIII;
Wallis Simpson (1896–1986), mistress and later wife of Edward VIII;
Dale Tryon, Baroness Tryon (1948–1997), mistress of Charles III, then-Prince of Wales;
Camilla (born 1947), mistress and later wife and Queen consort of Charles III, then-Prince of Wales.

In the Habsburg monarchy 
Anna Nahowski (1860-1930), mistress of Franz Joseph I.
Katharina Schratt (1853–1940), mistress of Franz Joseph I.
Baroness Mary Vetsera (1871–1889), mistress of Crown Prince Rudolf.

In Italy 
Rosa Vercellana (1833–1885), mistress and later wife of Victor Emmanuel II.

In Portugal 
Maria Peres de Enxara (1210–1279), mistress of Afonso III.
 Gaby Deslys (1881-1920), mistress of Manuel II.

In Romania 
Magda Lupescu (1899–1977); mistress and later wife of Carol II.

In Russia 

Anna Mons (1672–1714), mistress of Peter the Great;
Catherine I of Russia (1684–1727) mistress and later wife of Peter the Great;
Anna Lopukhina (1777–1805), mistress of Paul I;
Maria Naryshkina (1779–1854), mistress of Alexander I;
Catherine Dolgorukova (1847–1922), mistress and later wife of Alexander II.
Mathilde Kschessinska (1872-1971), mistress of Nicholas II prior to his betrothal to Alexandra.

In Scotland
Margaret Erskine (1515–1572), mistress of James V.

In Spain 

 Isabel Osorio (1522–1589), mistress of Philip II;

Bárbara Rey (born 1950), actress, Miss Spain, vedette and mistress of Juan Carlos I.

Corinna zu Sayn-Wittgenstein-Sayn (born 1964), mistress of Juan Carlos I.

In Sweden 

Hedvig Taube (1714–1744) mistress of Frederick I.

In the Netherlands 
Émilie Ambre (1849–1898), mistress of William III.

See also

 Concubinage
 English and British royal mistress
 Favourite
 Issue (genealogy)
 Legitimacy (family law)
 List of French royal mistresses
 Maîtresse-en-titre
 Royal bastard

Reference

Further reading
Friedman, Dennis. (2003). Ladies of the Bedchamber:The Role of the Royal Mistress. UK: Peter Owen Publishers. 
 Powell, Roger. (2010). ROYAL SEX: Mistresses and the Lovers of the British Royal Family. Amberley.  
Carlton, Charles. (1990). Royal Mistresses. Routledge. 
Cawthorne, Nigel. (1994). The Sex Lives of the Kings and Queens of England: from Henry VIII to the present day. Prion.  

 
History of Europe